Gone Wild may refer to: 

Gone Wild, a comedy album by The Bob & Tom Show
Gone Wild, a novel in the Rock War series by Robert Muchamore

See also
Girls Gone Wild (disambiguation)